Stan Shih (born 18 December 1944), is the Co-founder & Honorary Chairman of Acer Inc. In 1976, after receiving bachelor's and master's degrees in electronic engineering from National Chiao Tung University, Shih founded Multitech with his wife Carolyn Yeh and five partners. Shih chaired Multitech through to 1987, when the company was renamed Acer, continuing as Acer chairman until his retirement in late 2004, having seen the company grow from a tiny start-up to a billion-dollar worldwide brand. Shih remained active in charity work during his retirement, including serving as Taiwan's Special Envoy in  the APEC Australia 2007. In November 2013, Shih returned to Acer after being reinstated as president and chairman. He serves on the boards of Acer Inc., Taiwan Semiconductor Manufacturing Co., Nan Shan Life Insurance Co., Ltd., Taiwan Public Television Service Foundation and Chinese Television System. He is the Chairman of Cloud Gate Culture and Arts Foundation, the Head of Taiwan Connection Fun Club, One Song Orchestra Fun Club, the Convener of the Cultural Tech Alliance, Taiwan and the Chairman of CT Ambi Investment and Consulting Inc.

References

External links
 , Acer
 Stan Shih, Businessweek
 Stan Shih on Taiwan and China, Businessweek
 Q&A: STAN SHIH OF ACER, San Francisco Chronicle
 Stan Shih, 60 Years of Asian Heroes, Time Asia
 Stan Shih, CRN

1944 births
Acer Inc.
Living people
Hokkien businesspeople
Taiwanese businesspeople
Taiwanese people of Hoklo descent
People from Changhua County